Der Rattenfänger von Hameln (The Rat-Catcher of Hamelin or The Piper of Hamelin) is a grand opera (Große Oper) in five acts by Viktor Nessler.

Performance history

The opera was first performed at the Neues Stadttheater in Leipzig, on 19 March 1879, conducted by Arthur Nikisch. The first performance in the U.S. was at the Thalia Theatre, New York City, on 28 April 1886 conducted by John Lund.

The premiere in Vienna was given in 1897, which the critic Eduard Hanslick attended. He regarded the opera as overly long and old fashioned.

Roles

Synopsis

The 13th-century tale is about Hunold Singuf, a name given by Wolff in his poem to the "pied piper", who rids the town of Hamelin of its rats. Hunold is not suitably rewarded by the townspeople, and they pay a terrible price when he lures all the children away and they disappear.

References

Further reading
 Franklin, Peter (1992), "Rattenfänger von Hameln, Der" in The New Grove Dictionary of Opera, ed. Stanley Sadie (London)

External links

German-language operas
Operas by Viktor Nessler
1879 operas
Operas
Operas based on fairy tales
Operas set in the 13th century
Works based on Pied Piper of Hamelin